Professor Thomas Gwynn Jones C.B.E. (10 October 1871 – 7 March 1949), more widely known as T. Gwynn Jones, was a leading Welsh poet, scholar, literary critic, novelist, translator, and journalist who did important work in Welsh literature, Welsh education, and the study of Welsh folk tales in the first half of the twentieth century. He was also an accomplished translator into Welsh of works from English, German, Greek, and Irish.

Personal life
Thomas Jones was born at Y Gwyndy Uchaf in Betws-yn-Rhos, Denbighshire, Wales, the eldest son of Isaac Jones and Jane Roberts. He was educated in Denbigh and Abergele. In 1899 he married Margaret Jane Davies, the daughter of Thomas Davies of Denbigh, by whom he had three children.

Career
In 1890 he was a sub-editor on the Welsh-language newspaper Baner ac Amserau Cymru (Y Faner). He wrote a famous biography of the great Liberal publisher Thomas Gee, whose work influenced Jones throughout his life. After many years as a journalist, Jones worked at the National Library of Wales, Aberystwyth, and later as a lecturer in the Welsh department at the University College of Wales, Aberystwyth, where he became a professor in 1919.

He won the Chair at the National Eisteddfod of Wales in Bangor in 1902 for his ode, Ymadawiad Arthur. His major work was an edition of the fifteenth-century poet, Tudur Aled.

A strong opponent of the First World War, Jones walked out of the Tabernacle Chapel in Aberystwyth when the minister offered a prayer for a British victory in the war. He later wrote "If there's anything I understand from the New Testament, it is that Jesus Christ is not a militaristic person. He is the Saviour of the world, he is the Prince of Peace. Therefore those who say they are Christians, followers of Christ must reject war totally."

He was awarded CBE in the 1937 Coronation Honours.

Influence
T. Gwynn Jones's writings had a significant influence on Robert Graves in his mythopoeic study The White Goddess.  Graves developed his suggestion of a distinction between the restricted poetry of the official Welsh bards, and the more expansive and fanciful unofficial Welsh writings: "The tales and Romances, on the other hand, are full of colour and incident; even characterization is not absent from them.  In them fancy...develops into imagination".

Published works

Astudiaethau (1936)
(trans.), Awen y Gwyddyl (1922) – translated Irish poetry.
Bardism and Romance (1914)
Beirniadaeth a Myfyrdod (1935)
(trans.), Blodau o Hen Ardd (1927) – translated Greek epigrams.
Brethyn Cartref (1913)
Brithgofion (1944)
Caniadau (1934)
Cofiant Thomas Gee (1913)
Cymeriadau (1933)
Y Dwymyn (1944)
Dyddgwaith (1937)
Eglwys y Dyn Tlawd (1892)
Emrys ap Iwan. Cofiant (1912)
(trans.), Faust by Goethe (1922)
Gwedi Brad a Gofid (1898)
(ed.) Gwaith Tudur Aled, 2 vols., (1926)
Gwlad y Gân a cherddi eraill (1902)
John Homer (1923)
Lona (1923)
Llenyddiaeth Y Cymry (1915)
Rhieingerddi'r Gogynfeirdd (1915)
(trans.) Visions of the Sleeping Bard (1940)
Welsh Folklore and Welsh Folk-custom (1930)

References

External links
 
Welsh Biography Online – JONES, THOMAS GWYNN (1871–1949), poet, writer, translator and scholar
Description of the T. Gwynn Jones and Arthur ap Gwynn Papers

1871 births
1949 deaths
Academics of Aberystwyth University
British anti–World War I activists
Calvinist and Reformed poets
Calvinist pacifists
Chaired bards
Commanders of the Order of the British Empire
Epic poets
Mythopoeic writers
Translators of Johann Wolfgang von Goethe
Translators to Welsh
Welsh anti-war activists
Welsh children's writers
Welsh Eisteddfod winners
Welsh-language poets
Welsh-language writers
Welsh writers
Writers of Arthurian literature
Writers of modern Arthurian fiction